McCall-Donnelly High School is a four-year public secondary school in McCall, Idaho, the only traditional high school in the McCall-Donnelly Joint School District, and the largest high school in Valley County.  The school colors are blue, white, and red and the mascot is a Vandal.

The school district's territory, and therefore the high school's territory, includes sections of Valley and Adams counties, with 98% of its territory in the former and the remainder in the latter. Its service area includes McCall and Donnelly.

Athletics
McCall-Donnelly competes in athletics in IHSAA Class 3A in the Snake River Valley Conference.

State titles
Boys
 Soccer (1): fall (3A) 2004 (introduced in 2000)

Girls
 Cross Country (3): fall (A-3, now 2A) 1995, 1996, 1997  (introduced in 1974)
 Soccer (5): fall (3A) 2001, 2002, 2006, 2011, 2012  (introduced in 2000)
 Basketball (1): (A-3, now 2A) 1979  (introduced in 1976)
 Track (2): (A-3, now 2A) 1993, 1995  (introduced in 1971)

References

External links
 
 McCall-Donnelly Joint School District #421
 Max Preps: McCall-Donnelly Vandals sports teams

Public high schools in Idaho
Education in Valley County, Idaho